The Central Administration of Plant Quarantine is Egypt's agency for import and export regulation and inspection for plant health. It is an agency of the Ministry of Agriculture and Land Reclamation. CAPQ represents the country to international bodies and treaty organizations such as the International Plant Protection Convention and the Near East Plant Protection Organization (NEPPO), being the National Plant Protection Organization.

References

Phytosanitary authorities
Agriculture in Egypt